Mir Azizi-ye Qadim (also Romanized as Mīr ‘Azīzī-ye Qadīm) is a village in Sanjabi Rural District, Kuzaran District, Kermanshah County, Kermanshah Province, Iran. At the 2006 census, its population was 231, in 47 families.

References 

Populated places in Kermanshah County